AEW Fight Forever is an upcoming professional wrestling sports video game developed by Yuke's and published by THQ Nordic. The game will be the debut title on home consoles and personal computers from American professional wrestling promotion All Elite Wrestling (AEW). It is scheduled to be released for PlayStation 4, PlayStation 5, Microsoft Windows, Xbox One, Xbox Series X/S, and Nintendo Switch.

Gameplay 
Fight Forever features arcade-style gameplay, with nine match types in the launch version. These include singles match, tag team match, ladder match, Casino Battle Royale, and Exploding Barbed Wire Deathmatch. The game also features online play and intergender wrestling, the first Yuke's game since WWE SmackDown vs. Raw 2009 to do so.

The game features a full creation suite, including wrestlers, movesets, entrances, and arenas. A career mode will allow players to take their own created wrestler through the AEW schedule. Fight Forever will also feature a variety of mini-games. During November 10, 2020, at the AEW Games 1.0 Special Event, Kenny Omega confirmed that the game would be a spiritual successor to games like WWF No Mercy and Virtual Pro Wrestling, with gameplay in the style and veins as the AKI engine that ran those games.

Development
The game was announced on November 10, 2020, at the AEW Games 1.0 Special Event. The reveal trailer featured AEW wrestlers Kenny Omega, Chris Jericho, and Hikaru Shida. Hideyuki "Geta" Iwashita, director of WWF No Mercy and WCW/nWo Revenge, was also announced as the director. In June 2021, the first in-development gameplay video was released, including the reveal of Darby Allin. In September, another short gameplay video featuring Jungle Boy was released. In February 2022, Kenny Omega stated that the game would feature cross-platform play. 

Following the April 21, 2022 taping of AEW Dynamite, AEW founder Tony Khan told the live crowd that the title of the video game would be AEW: Fight Forever. This was later confirmed on May 4, 2022, with the release of gameplay videos featuring Kris Statlander and Nyla Rose. In June 2022, Omega stated in an interview with Fightful that the game was tentatively scheduled to release later that year. Omega later confirmed that the game would be published by THQ Nordic.

Release 
On August 3, 2022, AEW and THQ Nordic released an official teaser for the game, along with the cover art featuring CM Punk, Dr. Britt Baker, D.M.D., Kenny Omega, Chris Jericho, Jon Moxley, and Jade Cargill. However, due to CM Punk being suspended indefinitely following a backstage altercation at All Out, a new cover art without him was revealed in November, additionally featuring Sting, MJF, Orange Cassidy, Bryan Danielson, and "Hangman" Adam Page, alongside the wrestlers of the previous cover art.

On August 12, 2022, a trailer at the THQ Nordic Digital Showcase featuring Dr. Britt Baker, D.M.D. and Tony Schiavone was revealed, which one-on-one gameplay, as well as a look at the different mini-games in Fight Forever. It was also announced that a demo of the game would be playable at Gamescom, winning the award for Best Sports Game at the event. On September 15, 2022, a demo was also playable at the Tokyo Game Show.

References

External links
 

Upcoming video games scheduled for 2023
All Elite Wrestling
Professional wrestling games
Video games developed in Japan
Yuke's games
PlayStation 4 games
PlayStation 5 games
Xbox One games
Xbox Series X and Series S games
THQ Nordic games
Nintendo Switch games
Windows games